Aerovis Airlines is a cargo airline based in Kyiv, Ukraine. It was established in 2003 and operates charter cargo services within Ukraine, the European Union, Middle East and Africa.

Fleet 
As of June 2015, the Aerovis Airlines fleet includes:

References

External links
Official website

Airlines of Ukraine
Airlines established in 2003
Cargo airlines of Ukraine
Ukrainian companies established in 2003
Companies based in Kyiv